Thomas Ash Tomlinson (March 1802June 18, 1872) was a U.S. Representative from New York.

Born in New York City in March 1802, Tomlinson attended the schools of Champlain and Plattsburgh, New York. He studied law and gained admission to the bar, commencing practice in Keeseville, New York, in 1823. He was a mill owner and dealer in lands, serving as a colonel in the state militia and as a member of the New York State Assembly in 1835 and 1836.

Tomlinson was elected as a Whig to the Twenty-seventh Congress (March 4, 1841 – March 3, 1843). He thereafter resumed the practice of law and also engaged in the real estate business. He died in Keeseville, New York, June 18, 1872, and was interred in Evergreen Cemetery.

Sources

1802 births
1872 deaths
People from Keeseville, New York
New York (state) lawyers
Members of the New York State Assembly
American militia officers
Whig Party members of the United States House of Representatives from New York (state)
19th-century American politicians
19th-century American lawyers